Nathan Racker (born 23 November 1880, date of death unknown) was a cricketer. He played in five first-class matches for British Guiana from 1901 to 1905.

See also
 List of Guyanese representative cricketers

References

External links
 

1880 births
Year of death missing
Cricketers from British Guiana